General Confederation of Workers may refer to:

General Confederation of Workers (Mexico)
Confederação Geral dos Trabalhadores, General Confederation of Workers (Brazil)
General Confederation of Workers (Puerto Rico)